"Stoned" was released in the United Kingdom by the Rolling Stones on the Decca label on 1 November 1963, as the B-side to their version of "I Wanna Be Your Man".  Recorded in early October 1963, it was the first song released to be credited to "Nanker Phelge", and the band's first original composition, derivative of "Green Onions" by Booker T. & the M.G.s. This bluesy quasi-instrumental features Jones on harmonica and Stewart on tack piano, with occasional vocals from Jagger who huskily recites "Stoned .... outa mah mind .... where am I at?"

The single was briefly released in the United States on the London Records label early in 1964, but was quickly withdrawn on "moral grounds" until its inclusion on Singles Collection: The London Years in 1989.  It also appeared on the 1973 UK-only compilation No Stone Unturned, and on Singles 1963-1965 (2004).

The title was altered to "Stones" on some copies of the British release. The title "Stones" also appears on some foreign E.P.s.

Personnel
 Mick Jagger — vocals
 Keith Richards — guitar
 Brian Jones — harmonica
 Ian Stewart — piano
 Bill Wyman — bass guitar
 Charlie Watts — drums

Notes and references

1963 songs
The Rolling Stones songs
Decca Records singles
London Records singles
Songs written by Jagger–Richards
Rock instrumentals
1960s instrumentals